The 2018 World Women's Curling Championship (branded as the 2018 Ford World Women's Curling Championship for sponsorship reasons) was held from March 17–25 at the North Bay Memorial Gardens in North Bay, Ontario, Canada. The format of the tournament was changed this year, with 13 teams qualifying for the tournament (as opposed to 12 in previous years), and the top 6 teams from round-robin play will qualify for the playoffs (rather than 4).  The playoff system were single-knockout, where the top two teams received a bye while the remaining four played the first round.

The event was won by Canada's Jennifer Jones rink from Winnipeg; the second world championship for the 2014 Olympic gold medalists.

Off the ice, the event was a success and set an attendance record for a women's world championship held in Canada. Jennifer Jones was complimentary of the fans, saying she had never played in a louder arena.

Qualification
The following nations are qualified to participate in the 2018 World Women's Curling Championship:
 (host country)
One team from the Americas zone 

Eight teams from the 2017 European Curling Championships

Three teams from the 2017 Pacific-Asia Curling Championships

Teams
The teams are as follows:

Round-robin standings
Final round-robin standings

WCT ranking
Year to date World Curling Tour order of merit ranking for each team prior to the event.

Round-robin results
All draw times are listed in Eastern Daylight Time (UTC−4:00).

Draw 1
Saturday, March 17, 14:00

Draw 2
Saturday, March 17, 19:00

Draw 3
Sunday, March 18, 09:00

Draw 4
Sunday, March 18, 14:00

Draw 5
Sunday, March 18, 19:00

Draw 6
Monday, March 19, 09:00

Draw 7
Monday, March 19, 14:00

Draw 8
Monday, March 19, 19:00

Draw 9
Tuesday, March 20, 09:00

Draw 10
Tuesday, March 20, 14:00

Draw 11
Tuesday, March 20, 19:00

Draw 12
Wednesday, March 21, 09:00

Draw 13
Wednesday, March 21, 14:00

Draw 14
Wednesday, March 21, 19:00

Draw 15
Thursday, March 22, 09:00

Draw 16
Thursday, March 22, 14:00

Draw 17
Thursday, March 22, 19:00

Draw 18
Friday, March 23, 09:00

Draw 19
Friday, March 23, 14:00

Draw 20
Friday, March 23, 19:00

Playoffs

Qualification games
Saturday, March 24, 09:00

Semifinal 1
Saturday, March 24, 14:00

Semifinal 2
Saturday, March 24, 19:00

Bronze medal game
Sunday, March 25, 10:00

Gold medal game
Sunday, March 25, 15:00

Statistics

Top 5 player percentages
After round robin; minimum 5 games

Perfect games

Awards
The awards and all-star team are as follows:

All-Star Team
Skip:  Anna Hasselborg, Sweden
Third:  Sara McManus, Sweden
Second:  Galina Arsenkina, Russia
Lead:  Sofia Mabergs, Sweden

Frances Brodie Sportsmanship Award
 Jill Officer, Canada

References

External links

World Women's Curling Championship
2018 in Canadian curling
Curling in Northern Ontario
2018 in Ontario
Sport in North Bay, Ontario
March 2018 sports events in Canada
International curling competitions hosted by Canada
Women's curling competitions in Canada
2018 in Canadian women's sports
2018 in women's curling